The People's Participation Movement (Movimiento de Participación Popular) is a political party in Colombia. 
At the legislative elections on 10 March 2002, the party won parliamentary representation as one of the many small parties. In the simultaneous legislative elections of 2006, the party won 1 out of 166 Deputies and no senators.

Political parties in Colombia